Abano Pass is a mountain pass located in Georgia. At , it is one of the highest drivable mountain passes in the Caucasus.

Location
It is located in the Central Part of the Great Caucasus Mountains and connects two regions of Georgia: Kakheti to the south and Tusheti to the north.

Drivability
Due to high altitude and snowy winters the pass is closed from mid-October till mid-April (depending on snow amount and road conditions). The damaged road surface allows only 4x4 vehicles to go through.

References

External links
 dangerousroads.org - the world's most spectacular roads: Abano Pass

Mountain passes of Georgia (country)
Roads in Georgia (country)